Li Kongzheng (born 4 May 1959) is a Chinese diver.

At his first Olympic Games in 1984 he won a bronze medal in the 10 metre platform event. He also participated in the Seoul Olympics four years later, placing sixth in the same event.

He is now coaching at the University of Michigan and has had much success with all of his divers receiving national medals.

He has coached internationally, including Australia.

Family 

He has two children.

External links 
 Database Olympics

References 

1959 births
Living people
Chinese male divers
Divers at the 1984 Summer Olympics
Divers at the 1988 Summer Olympics
Olympic bronze medalists for China
Olympic divers of China
Olympic medalists in diving
Asian Games medalists in diving
Sportspeople from Guangxi
People from Nanning
Divers at the 1974 Asian Games
Divers at the 1978 Asian Games
Divers at the 1982 Asian Games
University of Michigan people
Medalists at the 1984 Summer Olympics
World Aquatics Championships medalists in diving
Asian Games gold medalists for China
Asian Games silver medalists for China
Medalists at the 1974 Asian Games
Medalists at the 1978 Asian Games
Medalists at the 1982 Asian Games
Universiade medalists in diving
Universiade gold medalists for China
Medalists at the 1979 Summer Universiade
Medalists at the 1981 Summer Universiade
Medalists at the 1987 Summer Universiade
20th-century Chinese people
21st-century Chinese people